Hunter × Hunter is an original video animation (OVA) series in the Hunter × Hunter media franchise. The story focuses on a young boy named Gon Freecss, who one day discovers that the father he had always been told was dead is in fact alive and well. He learns that his father, Ging, is a legendary "Hunter", an individual who has proven themself an elite member of humanity. Despite the fact that Ging left his son with his relatives in order to pursue his own dreams, Gon becomes determined to follow in his father's footsteps, pass the rigorous "Hunter Examination", and eventually find his father to become a Hunter in his own right.

Beginning in 1999, Nippon Animation produced a 62-episode anime television series based on Hunter × Hunter. Due to Hunter × Hunter fans' unsatisfied reactions to the conclusion of the adaptation in 2001, three subsequent original video animations (OVAs) produced by Nippon Animation have carried the story from where the broadcast left off. The first OVA series was directed by Satoshi Saga and released in eight episodes among four volumes from January 17 to April 17, 2002. The second OVA series, Hunter × Hunter: Greed Island, was directed Yukihiro Matsushita and was released in among eight episodes among four volumes from February 19 to May 21, 2003. The third OVA series, Hunter × Hunter: G.I. Final, was directed by Makoto Sato and was released in 14 episodes among seven volumes from March 3 to August 18, 2004. None of the OVAs have been released officially in English.

The background music for all three OVAs was composed by Toshihiko Sahashi. The first OVA series features the opening theme "Pale Ale" and the closing theme "Carry On", both by Kenichi Kurosawa. Hunter × Hunter: Greed Island features the opening theme "Pray" by Wish* and the closing theme "Popcorn" by Mikuni Shimokawa. Hunter × Hunter: G.I. Final features the opening theme "Believe in Tomorrow" and the closing theme , both by Sunflower's Garden.

Hunter × Hunter: Original Video Animation

Hunter × Hunter: Greed Island

Hunter × Hunter: G.I. Final

References

External links
Hunter × Hunter anime profile at Nippon Animation 

OVA
Anime film and television articles using incorrect naming style